Al-Malik as-Salih Najm al-Din Ayyub (5 November 1205 – 22 November 1249), nickname: Abu al-Futuh, also known as al-Malik al-Salih, was the Ayyubid Kurdish ruler of Egypt from 1240 to 1249.

Early life
In 1221, as-Salih became a hostage at the end of the Fifth Crusade, while John of Brienne became a hostage of as-Salih's father Al-Kamil, until Damietta was reconstructed and restored to Egypt. In 1232, he was given Hasankeyf in the Jazirah (now part of Turkey), which his father had captured from the Artuqids. In 1234 his father sent him to rule Damascus, removing him from the succession in Egypt after suspecting him of conspiring against him with the Mamluks. 

In 1238, al-Kamil died leaving as-Salih his designated heir in the Jazira, and his other son Al-Adil II as his heir in Egypt. In the dynastic disputes which followed, as-Salih took control of Damascus, in 1239, and set about using it as a base for enlarging his domain. 

He received representations from his father's old Emirs in Egypt, who appealed to him to remove his brother, while making ready to invade Egypt, he was informed that his brother had been captured by his soldiers and was being held prisoner. As-Salih was invited to come at once and assume the Sultanate.

In August 1239, Ayyub began pressuring Al-Salih Ismail to join him at Nablus for the campaign to take over Egypt from al-Adil II. Ayyub began to grow suspicious of Ismail's perceived procrastination and sent a noted physician, Sa'd al-Din al-Dimashqi, to find out what his vassal was doing. Ismail's vizier discovered Ayyub's scheme and secretly forged al-Dimashqi's recordings to mislead Ayyub into thinking Ismail was indeed on his way to Nablus. Eventually, Ismail, with the support of the Ayyubids of Kerak, Hama and Homs, captured Damascus from Ayyub in September 1239. Ayyub was abandoned by his troops and taken captive by local Bedouin who transferred him to al-Nasir Dawud's control, in which he was held as a prisoner in Kerak, along with Shajar al-Durr who gave birth to their son Khalil, and his Mamluk Rukn al-Din Baybars al-Salihi.

In April 1240, An-Nasir, quarreling with al-Adil II, released Ayyub and allied with him against the Egyptians, in return for a promise that Ayyub would reinstall him in Damascus. Al-Adil was imprisoned by his own troops, and Ayyub and An-Nasir made a triumphal entry into Cairo in June 1240, hence As-Salih became the paramount ruler of the Ayyubid family.

Rise of the Mamluks
Once installed in Cairo, As-Salih was far from secure. The complex nature of the Ayyubid state meant that the ruling family itself, as well as associated Kurdish clans, had divided loyalties. Within Egypt, a powerful faction of Emirs, the Ashrafiyya, were conspiring to depose him and replace him with his uncle, as-Salih Ismail, who had regained control of Damascus after his departure. As-Salih shut himself in the Cairo citadel, and could no longer trust even the once-loyal Emirs who had brought him to power. The lack of loyal soldiers led him to begin buying large numbers of Kipchak slaves, who were available in unusually large numbers following the Mongol invasions in central Asia. They soon formed the core of his army, and were known as Mamluks. As-Salih was not the first Ayyubid ruler to make use of Mamluks, but he was the first to depend on them so heavily. Rather than just recruiting small numbers of Mamluks, As-Salih established two complete corps of them, numbering up to 1000 men. One unit was known as the 'River Corps' or Baḥrīyah or Bahriyya, because they were garrisoned at Rawḍah island in the River Nile. The second, smaller corps was the Jamdārīyah, which appears to have operated as a body guard for As-Salih. As the Mamluks would eventually overthrow the Ayyubid dynasty and take power on their own, their early rise to prominence under As-Salih Ayyub is of considerable historical importance. In English, references to the Bahriyya after As-Salih's death, when they became the dominant power in Egypt, usually describe them as the Bahri Mamluks. The members of the Bahriyya who were recruited by As-Salih himself are also sometimes referred to as the Salihiyya. During his lifetime these terms were synonymous.

Wars with other Ayyubid realms and the Crusaders
The period 1240–1243 was largely occupied with complex military and diplomatic manoeuvres involving the Crusader states in Palestine and the European armies that arrived during the Barons' Crusade, other Ayyubid family rulers in Syria, and the Khwarezmians of Diyar Mudar who had previously been allied to as-Salih. Just as his Bahri Mamluks were important in enabling him to maintain order in Egypt, the Khwarezmians were useful in dominating the other Ayyubid rulers in neighbouring regions. In 1244, at As-Salih's invitation  the Khwarezmians advanced through Syria and Palestine and sacked Jerusalem, which had been handed over to Frederick II, Holy Roman Emperor by al-Kamil during the Sixth Crusade. Later that year as-Salih, again allied to the Khwarezmians, defeated as-Salih Ismail in Syria, who had allied with the crusader Kingdom of Jerusalem, at the Battle of La Forbie. In 1245 as-Salih captured Damascus, and was awarded the title of sultan by the caliph al-Musta'sim in Baghdad. As-Salih was not however able to extend his rule far beyond Damascus, although he was able to retain the emirate of Baalbek under Saʿd al-Din al-Humaidi. In 1246 he decided that his Khwarezmian allies were dangerously uncontrollable, so he turned on them and defeated them near Homs, killing their leader and dispersing the remnants throughout Syria and Palestine. As-Salih's capture of Jerusalem after the Khwarezmian sacking led to the call for a new Crusade in Europe, and Louis IX of France took up the cross. The campaign took several years to organise, but in 1249 Louis invaded Egypt on the Seventh Crusade, and occupied Damietta.

Death and legacy
As-Salih was away fighting his uncle in Syria when news of the Crusader invasion came, but he quickly returned to Egypt and encamped at al-Mansourah, where he died on 22 November after having his leg amputated in an attempt to save his life from a serious abscess. As-Salih did not trust his heir, al-Muazzam Turanshah, and had kept him at a safe distance from Egypt in Hasankeyf. As-Salih's widow, Shajar al-Durr, managed to hide his death until Turanshah arrived. Turanshah's rule was brief and was followed by a long and complicated interregnum until the Bahri Mamluks eventually took power. As-Salih was thus the last major Ayyubid ruler of Egypt, and the last to combine rule of Egypt with effective rule of parts of Palestine and Syria.

References

Sources
Al-Maqrizi, Al Selouk Leme'refatt Dewall al-Melouk, Dar al-kotob, 1997.

See also
List of rulers of Egypt

Ayyubid sultans of Egypt
Muslims of the Barons' Crusade
Muslims of the Seventh Crusade
1205 births
1249 deaths
Ayyubid emirs of Damascus
13th-century Ayyubid sultans of Egypt
13th-century Kurdish people